The Bahraini Crown Prince Cup was a Bahraini knockout tournament in men's association football that is played between the top-4 of the Bahraini Premier League in the previous year. The competition was run between 2001 until 2009 and was dominated by Muharraq Club and Bahrain Riffa Club.

Previous winners
2001 : Muharraq Club 5-4 Bahrain Riffa Club
2002 : Bahrain Riffa Club 3-2 Muharraq Club
2003 : Bahrain Riffa Club 3-1 Muharraq Club
2004 : Bahrain Riffa Club 2-1 Muharraq Club
2005 : Bahrain Riffa Club 3-1 Al Ahli
2006 : Muharraq Club 2-1 Bahrain Riffa Club
2007 : Muharraq Club 1-0 Al-Najma
2008 : Muharraq Club 5-2 Al Ahli
2009 : Muharraq Club 2-0 Bahrain Riffa Club

Top-Performing Clubs

References
 Bahrain - List of Cup Winners (RSSSF)

 
Crown
Crown
Recurring sporting events established in 2001
2001 establishments in Bahrain